William McClintock (7 March 1896 – 30 March 1946) was an English cricketer. He played for Gloucestershire between 1920 and 1921.

References

1896 births
1946 deaths
English cricketers
Gloucestershire cricketers
Cricketers from Newcastle upon Tyne